Scott Gaither is a retired American soccer player.  He played professionally in the Major Indoor Soccer League, National Professional Soccer League and Eastern Indoor Soccer League.

Youth
Gaither graduated from Belton High School.  He attended Lewis University playing only one season of soccer there before leaving to get married.  He entered the University of Missouri–Kansas City, but left to turn professional before he had played for them.  In 1990, having failed to earn a professional contract, Gaither attended Johnson County Community College where he played for one season.

Professional
In 1990, Gaither was invited to play at the MISL All-Star Budweiser Classic, a four team invitation tournament organized by the Major Indoor Soccer League to showcase potential talent for the upcoming college draft.  This led to the Kansas City Comets drafting Gaither, but he was signed to an amateur contract.   The Comets folded in 1991.  In 1992, the Kansas City Attack of the National Professional Soccer League signed Gaither.  He began the season in Kansas City, but was traded to the Detroit Rockers at the end of the season.  That season, he led the league in fouls.  In the summer of 1993, Gaither moved to the Monterrey La Raza of the Continental Indoor Soccer League.  In 1994, he played for the Portland Pride of the CISL.  On June 14, 1995, the Dustdevils signed Gaither.  On May 6, 1998, Gaither signed with the Mississippi Beach Kings of the Eastern Indoor Soccer League.  That was the last professional team for which he played.

External links
 Career stats

References

Living people
1969 births
American soccer players
Continental Indoor Soccer League players
Detroit Rockers players
Kansas City Comets (original MISL) players
Kansas City Attack players
Las Vegas Dustdevils players
Eastern Indoor Soccer League players
Monterrey La Raza players
Major Indoor Soccer League (1978–1992) players
National Professional Soccer League (1984–2001) players
Portland Pride players
Johnson County Community College people
Association football forwards